Basket Waregem is a Belgian basketball club based in Waregem. The team plays in the Belgian Second Division. Waregem won the second division title in 2014 and 2016.

Honours
Belgian Second Division
Champions (2): 2013–14, 2015–16
Runners-up (3): 2011–12, 2014–15, 2018–19

References

External links
Twitter profile

Basketball teams in Belgium